East Church Street–Starling Avenue Historic District is a national historic district located at Martinsville, Virginia. It encompasses 117 contributing buildings, 1 contributing structure, and 1 contributing object in a residential section of Martinsville.  The buildings range in date from the range in date from the mid-1880s to the mid-1950s and include notable examples of the Tudor Revival and Colonial Revival styles.  Notable buildings include the James Cheshire House, the Obidiah Allen House, John W. Carter House (1896), Christ Episcopal Church (1890s), G.T. Lester House or the “Wedding Cake House” (1918), John W. Townes House (c. 1925), Vaughn M. Draper House (c. 1930), and Martinsville High School (1940) and Gymnasium Building (1928).  Located in the district are the separately listed John Waddey Carter House, Scuffle Hill, and the Little Post Office.

It was listed on the National Register of Historic Places in 2006.

References

Historic districts on the National Register of Historic Places in Virginia
Colonial Revival architecture in Virginia
Tudor Revival architecture in Virginia
Buildings and structures in Martinsville, Virginia
National Register of Historic Places in Martinsville, Virginia